God's Man is a 1917 American silent drama film directed by George Irving and starring H.B. Warner, Kate Lester and Albert Tavernier. It is based on the novel of the same title by George Bronson Howard.

Cast
 H.B. Warner as Arnold L'Hommedieu
 Kate Lester as Mrs. L'Hommedieu
 Albert Tavernier as Richard L'Hommedieu
 Stanhope Wheatcroft as Paul L'Hommedieu
 Barbara Castleton as Bertie
 Barbara Gilroy as Eunice
 Sydney Vorzimer as Hans
 Edward Earle as Archie Hartogensis
 Harry B. Eytinge as Hartogesis Sr. 
 Mario Fouche as Carol Cato
 Ricca Allen as Mrs. Pickens
 Walter Hiers as Hugo Waldemar
 William Frederic as Joh Waldemar 
 Tom Burrough as The Philosopher 
 Marion Cumming as The Philosopher's Niece
 Maud de Vere as Mother Mybus
 Jean Stuart as Sonia
 Jack Sherrill as Pink
 Daniel Jarrett as Beau 
 Sidney D'Albrook as Quimby Quivvers

References

Bibliography
 Goble, Alan. The Complete Index to Literary Sources in Film. Walter de Gruyter, 1999.

External links
 

1917 films
1917 drama films
1910s English-language films
American silent feature films
Silent American drama films
American black-and-white films
Films directed by George Irving
Metro Pictures films
1910s American films